Reductive art is a term to describe an artistic style or an aesthetic, rather than an art movement. Movements and other terms associated with reductive art include Minimal art, ABC art, anti-illusionism, cool art, rejective art, Bauhaus aesthetic, work that emphasizes clarity, simplification, reduced means, reduction of form, streamlined composition, primary shapes, and restricted color. It is also characterized by the use of plain-spoken materials, precise craftsmanship and intellectual rigor.

See also
Robert Morris (artist)
Robert Ryman
Brice Marden
Agnes Martin
Michael Fried
Robert Mangold
Ivo Ringe

References

External links
 MINUS SPACE reductive art
 Patrick Morrissey and Hanz Hancock
 reductive music
 Saturation Point

Modern art
Abstract art
Contemporary art
Reductionism